Kamieniec Wrocławski is a village in the administrative district of Gmina Czernica, within Wrocław County, Lower Silesian Voivodeship, in south-western Poland.

The village has an approximate population of 2,000.

History
In the early 14th-century Liber fundationis episcopatus Vratislaviensis the village was mentioned under the Latinized form of its Old Polish name - Kamena. It was then part of Piast-ruled Poland.

During World War II, the Germans operated a forced labour subcamp of a Nazi prison in Wrocław in the village. Following Germany's defeat in the war, in 1945, the village became again part of Poland.

References

Villages in Wrocław County